Kevin Christopher O'Higgins (7 June 1892 – 10 July 1927) was an Irish politician who served as Vice-President of the Executive Council and Minister for Justice from 1922 to 1927, Minister for External Affairs from June 1927 to July 1927 and Minister for Economic Affairs from January 1922 to September 1922. He served as a Teachta Dála (TD) from 1918 to 1927.

He was part of early nationalist Sinn Féin, before going on to become a prominent member of Cumann na nGaedheal. In his capacity as Minister for Justice, O'Higgins established the Garda Síochána police force. His brother Thomas and nephews Tom and Michael were also elected TDs at various stages.

Along with Arthur Griffith, Michael Collins and Eoin O'Duffy, O'Higgins is an important figure in Irish nationalist historiography, representing a more "conservative revolutionary" position when contrasted with republicanism. After having a role in the Irish War of Independence, he went on to defend the nascent Irish Free State, as part of the pro-Treaty side in the Irish Civil War. During this time he signed the execution orders of seventy-seven political prisoners. He was later assassinated in retaliation by an IRA unit in Booterstown, County Dublin.

Background
Kevin O'Higgins was born in Stradbally, County Laois, one of sixteen children of Dr. Thomas Higgins and Anne Sullivan, daughter of the Nationalist politician Timothy Daniel Sullivan. His aunt was married to the Nationalist Member of Parliament (MP) Tim Healy. He was educated at the Jesuit-run Clongowes Wood College, where he was expelled. O'Higgins was then moved to Knockbeg College, St. Marys Christian Brother School, Portlaoise. With a view to becoming a priest he went to St Patrick's College, Maynooth. There he broke the non-smoking rules, and was removed to Carlow Seminary. He attended University College Dublin.

O'Higgins joined the Irish Volunteers in 1915. He was efficient, had a forceful personality and was soon appointed captain of Stradbally company, Carlow brigade. He joined Sinn Féin, but was soon arrested and imprisoned in 1918. While he was in prison he became MP for Queen's County (Laois).

1919–1923
In 1919, the First Dáil elected its "Aireacht" (Ministry) under the shadow of the Irish War of Independence. O'Higgins was appointed as the Assistant Minister for Local Government under W. T. Cosgrave. When Cosgrave was arrested in 1920, O'Higgins took the lead as head of the Ministry. Like other writers on Sinn Féin, O'Higgins believed the extremists were self-deluded; they themselves rejected the damning epithet "extremist". When he wrote on disillusionment he articulated this fear:

Sinn Féin then split in 1922 over the terms of the Anglo-Irish Treaty. In the debate that took place in the Dáil on the Treaty, O'Higgins outlined the reasons for his support thus:

When running for election in 1922, he told a crowd:

He was duly elected as a TD for Leix–Offaly, becoming Minister for Justice and External Affairs in the Provisional Government.

Irish Civil War

When the Irish Civil War broke out in June 1922, O'Higgins tried to restore law and order by introducing tough measures. Between then and mid-1923, he confirmed the sentences of execution of seventy-seven republican prisoners of war, including Rory O'Connor who had been best man at his wedding. O'Higgins and his colleagues did not view them as prisoners of war, but rather as criminals. On 11 February 1923, the Anti-Treaty IRA killed his father, who had snatched a revolver from the leader of a raiding party in his family home in Stradbally, County Laois.

O'Higgins feared, as did many of his colleagues, that a prolonged civil conflict would give the British an excuse, in the eyes of the world, to reassert their control in the Free State. He was given a nominal posting to the Irish Army during the early stages of the war, which he described as "very short, though very brilliant". General Richard Mulcahy was less impressed, recalling that "O'Higgins' personal presence in the Adjutant-General's office at that time (July–August 1922) was the personal presence of a person who didn't understand what was going on".

In August 1922, following Collins' assassination, O'Higgins was moved from the Army to Ministry of Home Affairs. O'Higgins had formed a negative view of Cosgrave, having worked under him at Local Government, and was not happy when the latter was appointed President of the Executive Council. Of the alternatives Mulcahy had been seen as indecisive, pedantic and too close to the Army (opinions which the subsequent Kenmare incident would make widespread), whereas O'Higgins himself was not avowedly republican. In the Government of the 3rd Dáil, he would be classed, along with Desmond FitzGerald, as one of the “Donnybrook set" – out of step with the rest on issues such as Irish language, autarky and militarism.

O'Higgins had set up the Garda Síochána, but by September 1922, the force was experiencing indiscipline in the ranks. He appointed Eoin O'Duffy as Garda Commissioner. At the time O'Duffy was a fine organiser and worked for the emergence of a respected and unarmed police force. O'Duffy insisted on a Catholic nationalist ethos to distinguish the Gardaí from their RIC predecessors. He became increasingly authoritarian in later years, however, a fact that caused several high-profile arguments between himself and O'Higgins. Cosgrave appointed O'Higgins as Vice-President in December that year.

Politics and later career
In March 1924, midway through the 'Army Mutiny', Minister Joseph McGrath resigned from the cabinet and President Cosgrave took sick leave. O'Higgins, as de facto head of government, reversed Cosgrave's policy of appeasement and confronted the IRAO mutineers confounding their objectives. In June, the Ministers and Secretaries Act 1924 changed his title from Minister for Home Affairs to Minister for Justice.

As Minister for External Affairs he successfully increased Ireland's autonomy within the Commonwealth of Nations. O'Higgins was seen very much as the "strong man" of the cabinet. He once described himself as one of "the most conservative-minded revolutionaries that ever put through a successful revolution". Though far-left political enemies characterised him as having supposed "fascist" tendencies, O'Higgins was to the fore in resisting the small wing of Cumann na nGaedheal who looked to Italy for inspiration. He did not approve of feminism, for instance when asked by Leader of the Labour Party Thomas Johnson in the Dáil whether he believed giving women the vote had been a success, O'Higgins replied,

He famously derided the socialist influenced Democratic Programme of the First Dáil as "mostly poetry". Before his death, he toyed with Arthur Griffith's idea of a dual monarchy to end the Partition of Ireland.

Assassination
At approximately midday on Sunday 10 July 1927, O'Higgins was assassinated at the age of 35 by three anti-Treaty members of the IRA, Timothy Coughlan, Bill Gannon and Archie Doyle, in revenge for O'Higgins' part in the executions of 77 IRA prisoners during the civil war. O'Higgins had been walking from his home on Cross Avenue, Blackrock to mass on Booterstown Avenue. He had been accompanied by an armed garda detective but had sent the detective back to Blackock to buy cigarettes. As he approached the junction with Booterstown Avenue, one of the assassins emerged from a parked car and shot him. O'Higgins ran a short distance before collapsing, and one of the assailants shot him again as he lay on the ground. The men then got back in their car and drove away. Despite being hit eight times, O'Higgins did not die for almost five hours.

None of the three assassins was ever apprehended or charged, but Coughlan, a member of Fianna Fáil as well as the IRA, was killed in strange circumstances in Dublin, in 1928, by a police undercover agent whom he was attempting to murder. The other two (Doyle and Gannon) benefited from the amnesty to IRA members issued by Éamon de Valera, upon his assumption of power in 1932. Gannon, who died in 1965, joined the Communist Party of Ireland and played a central role in organising Irish volunteers for the Spanish Civil War. Yet in party publications his part in assassinating O'Higgins is downplayed. Doyle remained a prominent IRA militant and took part in various acts in the early 1940s. He lived to an old age, dying in 1980, and continued to take pride in having killed O'Higgins.

Legacy
O'Higgins body lay in state in the Mansion House before a state funeral held at St Andrew's Church, Westland Row. He was buried at Glasnevin Cemetery.

In 1927, a relief of O'Higgins was posthumously added to a 1923 cenotaph in the grounds of Leinster House dedicated to Michael Collins and Arthur Griffith. This was replaced in 1950, by a simpler granite obelisk commemorating Griffith, Collins and O'Higgins.

In July 2012, Taoiseach Enda Kenny unveiled a commemorative plaque to his memory at the site in Booterstown, at the junction of Cross Avenue and Booterstown Avenue, where he was shot. Red paint was sprayed over this memorial within its first week, and it was further damaged shortly afterwards. It was removed some two weeks later and has not returned.

His brother Thomas F. O'Higgins and nephews Tom O'Higgins and Michael O'Higgins were later elected TDs. His granddaughter Iseult O'Malley is a judge of the Supreme Court of Ireland.

Gallery

See also
Families in the Oireachtas

References

Bibliography
 Cronin, Sean, The Ideology of the IRA (Ann Arbor 1972)
 De Paor, Liam, On the Easter Proclamation and Other Declarations (Dublin 1997)
 Macardle, Dorothy, The Irish Republic 1911–1923 (London 1937)
 McGarry, Fearghal, Eoin O'Duffy: A Self-made Hero (Oxford 2005)
 Markievicz, Constance de, What Irish republicans Stand For (Dublin 1922)
 Mitchell, Arthur, Revolutionary Government in Ireland: Dáil Éireann 1919–22 (Dublin 1995)
 Townshend, Charles, 'Civilisation and Frightfulness': Air Control in the Middle East between the Wars', in C.J.Wrigley (ed.), Warfare, Diplomacy and Politics: Essays in Honour of A.J.P.Taylor (London 1986)
 White, Terence de Vere, Kevin O'Higgins (London 1948)
 Younger, Calton, Ireland's Civil War (London 1968)

External links

Kevin O'Higgins – Biography on the O'Higgins Clan website

1892 births
1927 deaths
People from County Laois
Alumni of University College Dublin
Alumni of St Patrick's College, Maynooth
Assassinated Irish politicians
Burials at Glasnevin Cemetery
Cumann na nGaedheal TDs
Deaths by firearm in Ireland
Early Sinn Féin TDs
Irish anti-communists
Ministers for Foreign Affairs (Ireland)
Members of the 1st Dáil
Members of the 2nd Dáil
Members of the 3rd Dáil
Members of the 4th Dáil
Members of the 5th Dáil
Members of the Parliament of the United Kingdom for Queen's County constituencies (1801–1922)
Ministers for Justice (Ireland)
People educated at Clongowes Wood College
People educated at St Mary's Knockbeg College
People from Stradbally
People murdered in Ireland
People of the Irish Civil War (Pro-Treaty side)
Politicians from County Laois
UK MPs 1918–1922
1920s murders in Ireland
1927 murders in Europe
1927 crimes in Ireland
Vice-Presidents of the Executive Council of the Irish Free State